Ludovicus Stornebrink (sometimes written as Ludowicus and also known as Louis Stornebrink), was the founder of the Yokohama Ice Works in Yokohama, Japan. Stornebrink was born on 15 March 1847 in Rotterdam, The Netherlands and moved to Japan at an early age. In 1879 he became the founder and owner of the Yokohama Ice Works, Yokohama's first ice factory.

Stornebrink married a Japanese wife, Hana Ohta, and they had four children. Stornebrink died on 17 September 1917 and is buried, together with his wife, who died the following year, at the Foreign General Cemetery in Yokohama. His sister, Gertrude Stornebrink (21 February 1851-September 1923) is buried in the same grave.

External links
information about Stornebrink and the Ice Works (Japanese)
translation of the above
picture of the original Ice Works

1847 births
1917 deaths
19th-century Japanese businesspeople
Dutch emigrants to Japan